The Alversund Bridge is a suspension bridge spanning the Alverstraumen, a narrow strait between the island of Radøy and the mainland in the village of Alversund in Alver Municipality in Vestland county, Norway. The bridge was opened for traffic on 29 June 1958. The Alversund bridge was the first toll bridge collaboration project between the municipalities in the region of Nordhordland.

It was decided that even when the bridge was paid for in 1968, the toll fees would continue as a prepayment for the planned Nordhordland Bridge (opened in 1994).

References

Bridges completed in 1958
Suspension bridges in Norway
Road bridges in Vestland
Alver (municipality)
Former toll bridges in Norway
1958 establishments in Norway